Symbiosis is a compilation album by Demdike Stare, released on October 13, 2009 by Modern Love Records. It comprises the duo's two self-titled EPs, which had been exclusive to the vinyl format.

Track listing

Personnel
Adapted from the Symbiosis liner notes.

Demdike Stare
 Sean Canty – producer
 Miles Whittaker – producer

Production and additional personnel
 Danny Norbury – dulcimer, musical saw
 Andy Votel – cover art

Release history

References

External links 
 

2009 compilation albums
Demdike Stare albums
Modern Love Records albums
Instrumental compilation albums